Jasmin Mešanović (born 6 January 1992) is a Bosnian professional footballer who plays as a forward for NB I club Kisvárda.

Club career
Mešanović came through Sloboda Tuzla youth ranks, debuting at the age of 18 in April 2010.

He signed with Čelik Zenica in 2012. Mešanović then joined Osijek in July 2014 on a one-year deal.

In June 2015, he transferred to Zrinjski Mostar, signing a two-year contract. In June 2017, after he left Zrinjski on a free transfer, Mešanović signed a three-year deal with Slovenian PrvaLiga side Maribor.

On 20 February 2021, Mešanović returned to the Bosnian Premier League and signed a three-and-a-half-year contract with Sarajevo. He made his official debut for the club on 1 March 2021, in a Sarajevo derby league game against Željezničar. He scored his first goal for Sarajevo against Tuzla City on 21 April 2021, in a 2020–21 Bosnian Cup semi-final. Mešanović won his first trophy with Sarajevo on 26 May 2021, after beating Borac Banja Luka in the Bosnian Cup final.

International career
Mešanović has represented Bosnia and Herzegovina at under-21 level.

He made one appearance for the Bosnian senior team in a friendly against Poland on 16 December 2011, playing 23 minutes as a substitute in a 1–0 defeat.

Career statistics

Club

International

Honours
Zrinjski Mostar
Bosnian Premier League: 2015–16, 2016–17

Maribor
Slovenian PrvaLiga: 2018–19

Sarajevo
Bosnian Cup: 2020–21

References

External links

1992 births
Living people
Sportspeople from Tuzla
Bosnia and Herzegovina footballers
Bosnia and Herzegovina under-21 international footballers
Bosnia and Herzegovina international footballers
Bosnia and Herzegovina expatriate footballers
Association football forwards
FK Sloboda Tuzla players
NK Čelik Zenica players
NK Osijek players
HŠK Zrinjski Mostar players
NK Maribor players
FK Sarajevo players
Kisvárda FC players
Premier League of Bosnia and Herzegovina players
Croatian Football League players
Slovenian PrvaLiga players
Nemzeti Bajnokság I players
Expatriate footballers in Croatia
Expatriate footballers in Slovenia
Expatriate footballers in Hungary
Bosnia and Herzegovina expatriate sportspeople in Croatia
Bosnia and Herzegovina expatriate sportspeople in Slovenia
Bosnia and Herzegovina expatriate sportspeople in Hungary